Koyuga is a locality in the Goulburn Valley region of Victoria, Australia.

References

External links

Koyuga - Victorian Places

Towns in Victoria (Australia)